Peter Kempf (born September 15, 1939) is a former award-winning and Grey Cup champion kicker and tight end who played in the Canadian Football League from 1963 to 1968.

Kempf joined the BC Lions in 1963 and, with 109 points and 22 field goals (second in the league and then team records,) was winner of the Dr. Beattie Martin Trophy for Canadian rookie of the year in the west. In 1964 he again was second in the league with 81 points, adding 4 converts in the Leos' Grey Cup victory. Again second in scoring in 1965 with 82 points, after 48 games with the Lions he left for the Montreal Alouettes in 1966, where he played 14 games and scored 67 points. He played his final 2 seasons with the Edmonton Eskimos, including 32 games and 163 points.

He retired after scoring 502 points, additionally catching 70 passes for 834 yards and 5 touchdowns, and 1 interception.

References

1939 births
BC Lions players
Canadian Football League Rookie of the Year Award winners
Edmonton Elks players
Montreal Alouettes players
Living people